Elections to Ellesmere Port and Neston Borough Council were held on 4 May 2006. One third of the council was up for election and the Labour party stayed in overall control of the council. Overall turnout was 33.3%.

After the election, the composition of the council was
Labour 26
Conservative 15
Liberal Democrat 2

Results

Ward results

References
2006 Ellesmere Port and Neston election result
Ward results

2006 English local elections
2006
2000s in Cheshire